GP Kranj is a single-day road bicycle race held annually in June in Kranj, Slovenia. Since 2007, The race is organized as a 1.1 event on the UCI Europe Tour.

Winners

External links
  

UCI Europe Tour races
Cycle races in Slovenia
Recurring sporting events established in 1967
1967 establishments in Yugoslavia
Summer events in Slovenia